The 2019 King's Lynn and West Norfolk Borough Council election took place on 2 May 2019 to elect members of the King's Lynn and West Norfolk Borough Council in England. It was held on the same day as other local elections.

Results summary

Ward results

Airfield

Bircham with Rudhams

Brancaster

Burnham Market & Docking

Clenchwarton

Denver

Dersingham

Downham Old Town

East Downham

Emneth & Outwell

Fairstead

Feltwell

Gayton & Grimston

Gaywood Chase

Gaywood Clock

Gaywood North Bank

Heacham

Hunstanton

Massingham with Castle Acre

Methwold

North Downham

North Lynn

Snettisham

South & West Lynn

South Downham

Springwood

St. Margaret's with St. Nicholas

Terrington

The Woottons

Tilney, Mershe Lande & Wiggenhall

Upwell & Delph

Walsoken, West Walton & Walpole

Watlington

West Winch

Wissey

References

King's Lynn and West Norfolk Borough Council elections
2019 English local elections